On 28 February 2022, shortly after it was invaded by Russia, Ukraine applied for membership of the European Union (EU). Ukrainian President Volodymyr Zelenskyy requested immediate admission under a "new special procedure", and the presidents of eight EU states called for an accelerated accession process. European Commission president Ursula von der Leyen stated that she supports Ukrainian accession, but that the process would take time. On 1 March 2022, the European Parliament recommended that Ukraine be made an official membership candidate, and on 10 March 2022, the Council of the European Union asked the commission for its opinion on the application. On 8 April 2022, von der Leyen presented Zelenskyy with a legislative questionnaire, which Ukraine responded to on 9 May.

On 17 June 2022, the European Commission recommended that the European Council grant Ukraine candidate status for accession to the EU. Simultaneously with the recommendation to approve the status of the candidate, Brussels put forward demands to Kyiv for reforms, providing a list of seven points. These requirements must be met in order for Ukraine to maintain candidate status, because the granting of candidate status in June 2022 is not final and the EU can revoke it if the Ukrainian government does not make progress on the reform agenda.

On 23 June 2022, the European Parliament adopted a resolution calling for the immediate granting of candidate status for EU membership to Ukraine. On the same day, the European Council granted Ukraine the status of a candidate for accession to the EU.

Chronology of relations with the European Union 

The European Union–Ukraine Association Agreement was signed in 2014 after a series of events that had stalled its ratification culminated in a revolution in Ukraine and overthrow of the then incumbent President of Ukraine, Viktor Yanukovych. The Deep and Comprehensive Free Trade Area with Ukraine came into force on 1 September 2017 after being provisionally applied since 1 January 2016, and the Association Agreement fully came into force on 1 September 2017. On 24 February 2022, Russia invaded Ukraine, leading to the membership application.

2002–2005 

In 2002, EU Enlargement Commissioner Guenther Verheugen said that "the European perspective for Ukraine does not necessarily mean membership in the next 10-20 years, although it is possible." To join the European Union, the applicant state must meet the political and economic conditions commonly known as the Copenhagen Criteria (adopted at the Copenhagen Summit in 1993), namely a democratic government that recognizes the rule of law and relevant freedoms and institutions. According to the Maastricht Treaty, each current Member State, as well as the European Parliament, must agree on any enlargement.

Obtaining the status of a full member of the EU as a strategic goal of Ukraine was first declared by President of Ukraine Viktor Yushchenko immediately after his election in early 2005. On 13 January 2005, the European Parliament almost unanimously (467 in favor, 19 against) adopted a resolution on the European Parliament's intentions to converge with Ukraine on membership. The European Commission notes that, although a certain preparatory period has yet to pass, the admission of new members is not ruled out. To which President Yushchenko responded with his intention to apply for membership "in the near future."

Several influential EU leaders at the time expressed support for improving ties with Ukraine. In particular, Polish Foreign Minister Adam Rotfeld stated on 21 March 2005 that Poland would support Ukraine's European integration aspirations under any circumstances. In particular, he said: "At this stage, we should focus on concrete steps of cooperation instead of empty talks about pan-European cooperation." Three days later, a survey in the six largest EU countries showed the commitment of EU citizens to accept Ukraine as a full member in the future.

In October 2005, European Commission President Jose Manuel Barroso said that "Ukraine's future is in the EU." However, on 9 October 2005, the European Commission, in a new version of the Development Strategy Paper, stated that the implementation of enlargement plans (Croatia and the former Yugoslav Republics) could block the accession of Ukraine, Belarus and Moldova. Enlargement Commissioner Olli Rehn said the EU should avoid "too much enlargement", stressing that the current enlargement plan looks complete.

Although Ukrainian officials and political scientists mentioned several specific dates for possible membership, only Ukraine's European Neighborhood Policy has been officially proposed to Ukraine by the EU so far. The presidential administration has been critical of the proposed status of neighborhood relations.

2007–2014 

In March 2007, Ukraine was offered a Free Trade Agreement with the EU. Although this proposal provoked a much stronger reaction from the Ukrainian state, it did not contain specific plans for Ukraine's accession to the EU in the near future. Some Western European politicians have spoken of the temporary "fatigue of enlargement" of European institutions. Ukrainian observers identify the so-called "resistance group" of Ukraine's accession to the EU. In particular, when concluding the text of the Enhanced Agreement between Ukraine and the EU in March 2007, references to the prospect of membership were excluded from it. "Any mention of the prospect of Ukraine's accession to the European Union has been excluded from the draft enhanced Ukraine-EU agreement due to France's position," wrote the influential German newspaper Frankfurter Allgemeine Zeitung. Italy's position depends on the domestic political situation of this country. Thus, during the election campaign in this country, the government of Silvio Berlusconi gave diplomatic signals that he was ready to support Ukraine's European integration aspirations. His political opponent Romano Prodi, on the other hand, said that "Ukraine's prospects for joining the EU are the same as in New Zealand."

According to the Eastern Partnership policy, Ukraine can become a member of the European Union. On 27 February 2014 the European Parliament passed a resolution that recognized Ukraine's right to "apply to become a Member of the Union, provided that it adheres to the principles of democracy, respects fundamental freedoms and human and minority rights, and ensures the rule of law". The European Parliament notes that in accordance with Article 49 of the Treaty with the EU, Georgia, Moldova and Ukraine, like any other European country, have a European perspective and can apply for EU membership in accordance with the principles of democracy, - said in a resolution of the European Parliament in Brussels, adopted at the last session before the elections to the European Parliament, which took place on 23–25 May 2014. 27 June 2014 The President of the European Commission Jose Manuel Barroso stated that the Association Agreement is the beginning of Ukraine's accession to the EU. On the same day, EU Enlargement Commissioner Stefan Fuele stated that he believed in Ukraine's future membership in the EU.

2014–2022 

In March 2016, President of the European Commission Jean-Claude Juncker stated that it would take at least 20–25 years for Ukraine to join the EU and NATO. In June 2018, President of Ukraine Petro Poroshenko said he expects Ukraine will join the European Union and the North Atlantic Treaty Organisation by 2030.

On 21 February 2019, the Constitution of Ukraine was amended to enshrine the norms on the strategic course of Ukraine for membership in the European Union and NATO in the preamble of the Basic Law, three articles and transitional provisions.

At the X session of the Ukraine–Poland–Lithuania Interparliamentary Assembly, which ended on 8 June 2019 in Kyiv, the parties signed a final document containing an agreement on the strategy of 2025 and 2027 as a period for Ukraine's possible accession to the EU. In 2027, when Lithuania will hold the EU presidency for the second time, the issue of Ukraine will be the main issue on the agenda. If this opportunity is not used, the next "window" will open in 2039, when Poland will preside over the EU and Lithuania will preside only in 2041.

On 23 July 2020, Poland, Lithuania and Ukraine created a tripartite platform for political, economic, cultural and social cooperation - the Lublin Triangle, which aims to support Ukraine's integration into the EU and NATO.

In February 2021, the leader of the presiding Christian Democratic Union of Germany, Armin Laschet, who was considered a likely successor to Angela Merkel as Chancellor of Germany, supported the idea of EU enlargement and giving Ukraine a European perspective:"The question of Ukraine's accession to the EU does not arise at the moment, but it will inevitably arise in the future. We must support Ukraine on its difficult path and at the same time open a European perspective."Quite a few experts believe that in times of deteriorating relations between Russia and the EU, Ukraine has a window of opportunity to join the European Union. Pavlo Klimkin noted that Ukraine still does not meet any criteria for joining the European Union, as it does not have an established democracy, rule of law and a full-fledged market economy. According to him, the first chance was lost in early 2005, when Yushchenko was persuaded not to apply, and in 2014, it was much more difficult to do so.

On 11 February 2021, the European Parliament published a report on Ukraine's success in implementing the Association Agreement with the European Union. The document highlights both the main successes of Ukraine on this path, as well as failures or moments that hinder the reform process in the country. In general, the European Union is not yet ready to officially talk about the prospects of Ukraine's accession to the ranks of member states, but Ukraine's European perspective is recognized. In 2021, Ukraine was preparing to formally apply for EU membership in 2024, in order to join the European Union in the 2030s.

Application 

Following the 2022 Russian invasion of Ukraine, there were additional calls to start a formal accession process: Ukraine reiterated its desire to become a member of the union, and European Commission president von der Leyen stated that Ukraine belongs in the European Union. Slovak prime minister Eduard Heger expressed support for an accelerated accession process.

On 26 February 2022, Polish president Andrzej Duda called for Ukraine's accelerated accession to the EU. On 27 February, Slovenian prime minister Janez Janša, together with Polish prime minister Mateusz Morawiecki, proposed a plan for Ukraine's rapid integration into the EU by 2030 in a letter to European Council president Charles Michel. Slovakian prime minister Eduard Heger also proposed to the EU to create a new special procedure for Ukrainian accession, in order to help Ukraine get back on its feet and recover from the war in the future.

On 28 February, Ukraine officially submitted a letter of application for membership. Due to the ongoing crisis, President Zelenskyy requested immediate admission to the European Union under a special procedure. On the same day, eight EU states signed a letter supporting an accelerated accession process for Ukraine, and on 1 March, Hungarian foreign minister Péter Szijjártó stated his country would also support an accelerated process. On 1 March, the European Parliament, following a debate in which the President of Ukraine addressed and received applause, recommended that Ukraine be made an official candidate for EU membership. The European Parliament voted to advance Ukraine's membership with 637 in favour, 13 against, and 26 abstained.

On 1 March, the presidents of eight EU member states (Bulgaria, the Czech Republic, Estonia, Latvia, Lithuania, Poland, Slovakia and Slovenia) signed an open letter calling on Ukraine to be given the prospect of EU membership and start the process of negotiations immediately. On the same day, Hungarian foreign minister Péter Szijjártó called for Ukraine's accelerated accession to the European Union.

On 2 March, Spanish foreign minister José Manuel Albares stated that "belonging to the EU is not a capricious process or one that can be done by a mere political decision", reminding that the candidate country "must meet certain social, political and economic standards".

On 7 March, the EU said it will formally assess Ukraine's application and on 10 March, the Council of the European Union asked the commission for its opinion on the application.

On 9 March, the Polish Senate adopted a resolution calling on the countries of the European Union to support the accelerated process of Ukraine's accession to the EU with 93 votes in favor. "Ukrainian society has undoubtedly proved that it is ready to be part of a united Europe and ready to pay with blood for devotion to European values. Ukrainian soldiers, defending the borders of their country, protect the whole of Europe," the document reads.

On 8 April, Commission President von der Leyen, after visiting Bucha in the aftermath of the massacre, visited Kyiv and met with President Zelenskyy. Von der Leyen presented Zelenskyy with the legislative questionnaire to begin Ukraine's application and offered to fast-track the process. Borrell announced that the EU delegation to Ukraine, headed by Matti Maasikas, will return to Kyiv after it was evacuated at the outbreak of war. On 17 April, Ukraine responded to the first part of the legislative questionnaire, while it responded to the second and final part on 9 May.

According to Deputy Prime Minister of Ukraine Olha Stefanishyna, three EU countries opposed granting the status to Ukraine; according to Bloomberg, the Netherlands and Denmark were two of them. Germany, on the other hand, offered to give Ukraine a conditional status, under promises to fulfill certain requirements.

On 29 May, in order to support Ukraine's accession to the EU, in particular to obtain the status of a candidate for membership in the European Union, the Government of Ukraine launched a communication campaign "Embrace Ukraine. Strengthen the Union" set for 25–26 June.

After a meeting with Volodymyr Zelenskyy on 16 June in Kyiv, the leaders of Germany, Italy, Romania and France called for immediate candidate status for EU membership for Ukraine. Federal Chancellor of Germany Olaf Scholz noted that Ukraine's further movement into the EU, if all countries agree to grant it candidate status, depends on its own efforts. Separately, French President Emmanuel Macron explained that the visit to Ukraine of the leaders of the three largest EU economies - Germany, Italy and France, as well as the President of Romania was aimed at creating unanimity in the European Union regarding Ukraine's first step towards accession, which is the granting of candidate status: it was accepted the decision to grant Ukraine candidate status without additional conditions, but then to impose conditions on reforms at all subsequent stages.

On 17 June, Foreign Minister Jeppe Kofod said that the Danish government is ready to support granting Ukraine candidate status for EU accession if the European Commission provides a positive recommendation. The Netherlands on the same day appealed to the European Commission with a call to carefully prescribe the conditions for Ukraine's further approach to EU membership. In particular, the European Commission is called upon to prescribe in its conclusion what reforms Ukraine will have to implement in the future. The Netherlands provided a detailed description of what they consider to be the essential criteria.

Also on 17 June, the European Commission recommended that the European Council grant Ukraine the perspective to become a member of the European Union and candidate status for accession. Simultaneously with the recommendation to approve the candidate status, the Commission listed seven required reforms to be implemented by Ukraine:

 reform of the Constitutional Court;
 continuation of judicial reform;
 anti-corruption, including the appointment of the head of the SAPO;
 anti-money laundering;
 implementation of the anti-oligarchic law, including recommendations of the Venice Commission;
 harmonization of audiovisual legislation with European;
 change in legislation on national minorities.

These requirements had to be met in order for Ukraine to retain its candidate status. The candidate status of June 2022 was contingent, not final.

On 23 June, the European Parliament adopted a resolution calling for the immediate granting of candidate status for membership of the European Union to Ukraine and Moldova, as well as to support the European perspective for Georgia. On the same day, the European Council granted Ukraine the status of a candidate for accession to the European Union.

Negotiations 

At first, the European Commission committed to assess completion of the seven criteria at the end of 2022, after which the next steps will be defined. The Ukrainian government pledged that it would complete the seven requirements by the end of autumn 2022. However, the European Council indicated this assessment would be considered at the next annual enlargement package in October 2023.

By November 2022 the Commission had still not started its assessment of the criteria and an independent assessment by European Pravda assessed progress at only 4.7/10. In December the Commission agreed to present a "preliminary assessment" of the seven requirements by spring 2023.

In 2023, the German Green parliamentarian Anton Hofreiter argued that the accession of Ukraine to the EU should happen within five to six years, underlining the negative effects of long wait times for accession candidates demonstrated by the example of the Western Balkans.

On 2 February 2023, the European Commission published an analytical report on Ukraine's alignment with the EU acquis.

Public opinion

In Ukraine 

Traditionally, Western Ukraine is found to be generally more enthusiastic about EU membership than Eastern Ukraine. In July 2012 and in May 2014, residents of West Ukraine (74% in July 2012 and 81% in May 2014), Central Ukraine (59% and 64%) and North Ukraine (56% and 71%) were the biggest supporters for EU membership. A June 2013 poll, on behalf of Deutsche Welle, found that 52% of Eastern Ukraine was in favor of joining the EU. But in a poll by ComRes (for CNN) in May 2014 only 19% of Eastern Ukraine considered Ukraine joining the European Union "Good". The May 2014 ComRes poll found out that in the three most eastern Oblasts of Ukraine (provinces), Kharkiv Oblast, Donetsk Oblast and Luhansk Oblast, 37% favored an alliance with Russia, 14% backed an alliance with the European Union and 49% stated Ukraine would be better off if it did not ally with either.

Citizens aged between 20 and 39 appeared to be the strongest supporters of joining the EU in May 2010 and December 2011 (in December 2011 the opinion of the age group 18–29 did not vary from one region to another). In the May 2014 ComRes poll, people aged between 36 and 55 where the strongest supporters of joining the EU. Ukraine's EU ambassador, Kostiantyn Yelisieiev, stated in July 2011 that business tycoons and politicians from Ukraine's Russian speaking east were as much pro-EU as the Ukrainian speaking west of the country: "If any politician today in Ukraine declared himself to be against European integration, he would be politically dead."

91% of Ukrainians support joining the European Union during the 2022 Russian invasion of Ukraine, according to a poll conducted by the Rating Sociological Group on 30–31 March 2022, up from 66.4% in February 2015.

In the EU 

According to a survey conducted by Ifop commissioned by the Yalta European Strategy and the Fondation Jean-Jaurès from 3–7 March 2022, Ukraine's accession to the EU is supported by 92% of respondents in Poland, 71% in Italy, 68% in Germany, and 62% in France.

The Flash Eurobarometer survey conducted in April in all EU countries shows the greatest support for Ukraine's accession to the EU in Portugal, where 87% of respondents supported it. This is followed by Estonia (83%), Lithuania (82%), Poland (81%) and Ireland (79%). Hungarians are the most skeptical about Ukraine's accession, with only 48% of respondents supporting the idea and 37% against it. At the same time, Hungary has the highest share of the population who is undecided on this issue - 16% (the same in France and Belgium).

According to a poll commissioned by the New Europe Center, which has European Pravda, among those who have decided on their position, 68% of Germans, 65% of French, and 65% of Dutch people were in favor of granting Ukraine a candidacy. At the same time, 32% of Germans and 35% of the French and the Dutch each oppose such a decision. In general, 46% of Germans residents support granting Ukraine the status of a candidate for EU membership, 22% are against it, another 25% found it difficult to answer, and 7% found it difficult to answer the question. Among French residents, 42% support granting Ukraine candidate status, 24% do not support it, 26% do not have a clear position, another 9% found it difficult to answer. In the Netherlands, 45% of respondents support Ukraine's candidacy, 24% are opposed, 21% found it difficult to choose an answer, and 10% do not know.

Impact of joining

See also  
 Ukraine–European Union relations 
 Georgia–European Union relations 
 Accession of Moldova to the European Union
 Russian invasion of Ukraine (2022–present)
 Ukraine–NATO relations

References

External links 
 
 Official websites:
 European Neighbourhood Policy and Enlargement Negotiations
 EU Solidarity with Ukraine
 Delegation of the European Union to Ukraine

Ukraine
Ukraine–European Union relations
Events affected by the 2022 Russian invasion of Ukraine